The following is a list of animated works as commissioned by Allspark Animation (a subsidiary of American toy company Hasbro; previously credited under Hasbro Studios) as a part of My Little Pony: Equestria Girls toy line and media franchise, which is a spin-off of the 2010 incarnation of Hasbro's My Little Pony.

The productions, especially films (2013–2016) and specials (since 2017), are tie-ins to the yearly Equestria Girls line-up of toys. The animations revolve around the main cast of My Little Pony: Friendship Is Magic (the main My Little Pony line's television series), normally ponies, as teenage human characters in a high school setting in an alternate universe.

Most of animated media were produced by DHX Studios Vancouver's 2D animation team in Canada, with the exception of Canterlot Shorts from 2017, which were produced by Boulder Media in the Republic of Ireland (a company acquired by Hasbro in 2016).

The following works were produced under this scope:

Films and shorts
 Equestria Girls (2013)
 Rainbow Rocks (2014)
 Rainbow Rocks prelude shorts and Rainbow Rocks encore shorts (2014) 
 Friendship Games (2015)
 Friendship Games prelude shorts (2015)
 Legend of Everfree (2016)

Specials
 Magical Movie Night (2017)
 "Dance Magic"
 "Movie Magic"
 "Mirror Magic"
 Forgotten Friendship (2018)
 Rollercoaster of Friendship (2018)
 Spring Breakdown (2019)
 Sunset's Backstage Pass (2019)
 Holidays Unwrapped (2019)

Shorts
 Summertime Shorts (2017)
 Canterlot Shorts
 Music videos
 Better Together shorts (2017–2020)

In the United States, the Equestria Girls animations were broadcast on television on Discovery Family (a joint venture between Discovery, Inc. and Hasbro) and/or released online on its TV Everywhere platform Discovery Family Go, and released on the physical home media by Shout! Factory. The first three films, Equestria Girls, Rainbow Rocks and Friendship Games, each had a premiere screening event held prior to the release, with the first two films additionally having limited release in select theaters. Animated shorts (and, later, certain specials) were released freely worldwide on YouTube through Hasbro's official channels, and previously on the toy line's official website.

This list does not include Equestria Girls Minis animated shorts, the production company behind which is yet to be identified; see My Little Pony: Equestria Girls#Equestria Girls Minis shorts for details about the particular shorts.

Premise
As with the toy line, the animations are primarily set in a fictional world parallel to the pony-inhabited fantasy setting of the 2010 incarnation of My Little Pony, accessible via a magic mirror. The media additionally features alternate humanoid versions of pony characters in roles similar to the counterparts in Equestria; characters as depicted in the Friendship Is Magic television series who travel between worlds assume similar forms in the alternative setting.

The first film, Equestria Girls, follows Equestria's Twilight Sparkle in the parallel world, which is accessed through a magic mirror. Together, with the counterparts of her pony friends, Rainbow Dash, Pinkie Pie, Applejack, Rarity, and Fluttershy, along with her assistant Spike, Twilight will have to deal with the various magical happenings in Canterlot High that originate from the mirror portal.

Later works put Sunset Shimmer, introduced in the first film as the major antagonist who betrayed her former teacher Princess Celestia but later reformed, in a reading role in place of Equestria's Twilight Sparkle. Friendship Games formally introduced the parallel world counterpart of Twilight Sparkle ( "Sci-Twi").

Productions
Allspark Animation (previsiously credited as Hasbro Studios), a subsidiary of Hasbro responsible for non-toy multimedia strategies, commissioned the productions. DHX Studios Vancouver's 2D animation team, part of Canadian company DHX Media's DHX Studios division, produced most of animations. However, the Canterlot Shorts portions of the so-called Summertime Shorts were produced by Boulder Media, an animation studio located in Dublin, Republic of Ireland, that Hasbro acquired in 2016.

To maintain continuity of the films with the Friendship Is Magic television series, Hasbro used the same writing staff as the show, including the story editor Meghan McCarthy, who considered the story to be "an extension of our mythology". McCarthy stated that with the Equestria Girls setting, "we might explore different aspects of relationships that in the pony world don't quite work the same as they do when you set it in a high school setting", thus making the work more appealing to older girls that are in high or junior high school.

Films (2013–2016)
Four Equestria Girls animated feature films, each lasting around 70 minutes, were released between 2013 and 2016, promoting the year's particular line-up of Equestria Girls dolls. The films were then followed by the animated specials beginning in 2017 (the year My Little Pony: The Movie, a wide release animated feature film, was distributed by Lionsgate Films).

The first two films were written by Meghan McCarthy and directed by Jayson Thiessen; the third film was written by Josh Haber and directed by Ishi Rudell; the fourth film was written by Kristine Songco and Joanna Lewis, and directed by Ishi Rudell.

Hasbro Studios listed the films as "TV specials" in the company's sales guide. However, in the United States and Canada, the first two films, Equestria Girls and Rainbow Rocks, had limited theatrical screenings in select cities before they were released on home media (by Shout! Factory for the region) and broadcast on television. In the U.S., these films were screened in Screenvision theaters, without any rating from the MPAA, while in Canada, they were shown in Cineplex theaters, with classifications from provincial film boards. There are no box office records in either area are available for the two films. Internationally, there have been theatrical releases of the films in some areas, but in most cases the films were only shown on television before (or after) it was released on home media.

Equestria Girls (2013)

In writing the script of the first film, Equestria Girls, Meghan McCarthy went back to the self-titled two-part pilot episodes of Friendship Is Magic, where Twilight Sparkle is sent to Ponyville for the first time and forced to meet new friends. She wanted to do the same with the film, in this case putting Twilight into a new world where she would again be forced to make new friends to succeed in her quest. Released in 2013, the film was premiered on June 15 as a part of Los Angeles Film Festival that year, before having limited theatrical releases in the United States and Canada the next day, and was released on home media on August 6.

Rainbow Rocks (2014)

The second film released in 2014, Rainbow Rocks centers around Twilight Sparkle, Sunset Shimmer and friends' activities against evil sirens using music. On February 13, 2014, Meghan McCarthy wrote on Twitter that she had worked on the film during the summer of 2013. That same day, songwriter Daniel Ingram also wrote on the service that there would be a total of 12 songs in the film; however, only 11 songs were used in the film. The film had a limited theatrical release from September 27, 2014, before it was out on home media on October 28 that year.

Friendship Games (2015)

Released in 2015, the third installment, Friendship Games, was first teased by Rainbow Rocks co-director, Ishi Rudell on December 12, 2014. The film was first broadcast on September 26, 2015 on Discovery Family in the U.S. and Family Channel in Canada, and was released on home media on October 13 that year. In the film, the alternative universe counterpart of Twilight Sparkle, a student at Crystal Prep, is forced by Principal Abacus Cinch to disrupt Friendship Games (a sporting event held every four years with Canterlot High) with magic.

Legend of Everfree (2016)

On October 3, 2015, CEO of Hasbro Studios Stephen Davis said that a fourth film, subtitled Legend of Everfree, was in development. The film was released on Netflix on October 1, 2016, and the home media release followed on November 1, 2016. In the film, the protagonists follow the damages at Camp Everfree caused by a creature so-called Gaea Everfree.

Specials (2017–2019)
Beginning in 2017, Hasbro released Equestria Girls animated specials in place of feature films. As with the four previous films, the specials promote the year's particular line-up of Equestria Girls dolls.

The three 22-minute specials were released in 2017. The following year, 2018, Hasbro began releasing extended specials. The original version of Forgotten Friendship (the first special to be produced under the current cycle) lasts around 50 minutes, but it was cut to around 44 minutes for television broadcasts. Subsequent specials (Rollercoaster of Friendship, Spring Breakdown, Sunset's Backstage Pass, Holidays Unwrapped) were produced to fit around the length of 44 minutes.

The specials since 2018 are also released freely worldwide on YouTube, after the initial release in the United States, through Hasbro's official channels. The YouTube release of specials are divided into parts, and released sequentially every week, in line with the Better Together shorts.

2017 specials

Three animated specials, each lasting around 22 minutes, were first announced in October 2016. The specials were broadcast on Discovery Family on Saturdays from June 24 to July 8, 2017, as a part of the channel's "Summer Splash" seasonal event. The first of the specials, "Dance Magic", focuses on the protagonists' attempt to enter a music video contest to win an amount of prize money, which they plan to use to help repair Camp Everfree; the second, "Movie Magic", follows the protagonists, who were invited to a film studio tour, encounter a series of incidents while the filming was taking place, and begin a group investigation; in "Mirror Magic", the last of the specials, Sunset Shimmer takes Starlight Glimmer to a tour of the parallel universe, and a corrupted mirror slowly influences a girl.

Forgotten Friendship (2018)

Forgotten Friendship ( Most Likely to be Forgotten), which succeeded the 2017 specials, was broadcast on February 17, 2018, on Discovery Family. The story follows Sunset Shimmer's discovery that her friends' memories of her have been mysteriously erased; she returns to Equestria and seeks help from Twilight Sparkle to find the cause before the memories vanish for good.

Rollercoaster of Friendship (2018)

Rollercoaster of Friendship was broadcast on July 6, 2018, on Discovery Family as a part of its "Summer Surprises" seasonal event. The story follows Rarity's acceptance of a summer job as a costume designer for a new amusement park and the strain that it puts on her friendship with the other girls, particularly Applejack.

Spring Breakdown (2019)

Spring Breakdown was broadcast on Discovery Family on March 30, 2019. In this special, the girls take a luxury cruise for spring break, but wayward magic imperils the passengers and forces Sunset Shimmer, and the parallel universe counterpart of Twilight Sparkle and Rainbow Dash to visit Equestria for help from Ponyville's Twilight Sparkle.

Sunset's Backstage Pass (2019)

Sunset's Backstage Pass was broadcast on Discovery Family on July 27, 2019. It follows Sunset Shimmer as she attends a music festival along with other protagonists but finds herself stuck in a time loop.

Holidays Unwrapped (2019)

Holidays Unwrapped, a holiday season special, was broadcast on Discovery Family on November 2, 2019. Presented in an omnibus manner, the special follows the protagonists who prepare for, and enjoy, the parallel universe's equivalent of Christmas and holiday season.

Shorts (2014–2015; 2017–2020)

Rainbow Rocks and Friendship Games complementary shorts (2014–2015)

Feature films Rainbow Rocks and Friendship Games are each accompanied by a series of animated shorts released online. 8 animated shorts which served as a prelude to Rainbow Rocks were released in 2014, followed by 3 encore shorts to Rainbow Rocks and 5 prelude shorts to Friendship Games (in total, 8 animated shorts) in 2015. The shorts are also included in physical home media releases of the films as a part of special features.

Summer 2017 shorts

During the Northern Hemisphere summer season of 2017, two series of animated shorts (not to be confused with the Better Together shorts that began later in the same year) were broadcast on Discovery Family (where they are billed together as Summertime Shorts) as a part of the channel's "Summer Splash" seasonal event. One series, the Canterlot Shorts, was produced by Boulder Media in the Republic of Ireland, while the other, a series of music videos, was produced by DHX Studios Vancouver's 2D animation team in Canada. The shorts were later released internationally on YouTube by Hasbro through its official channel.

Better Together shorts (2017–2020)

A plan to release a series of Equestria Girls animated shorts online sometime in 2018 was first mentioned at Hasbro's 2017 Investor Day event held in August that year. The plan was apparently brought forward, as the series (not to be confused with the summer 2017 shorts that were released earlier in the same year), also known as Better Together shorts, was released on Discovery Family Go TV Everywhere platform in the United States in early November 2017, before having a worldwide debut on YouTube later in the same month. On YouTube, the shorts were released by Hasbro's official channel, before moving to My Little Pony's official channel.

As well as normal animated shorts, each season also includes a number of interactive shorts (initially labelled as "Choose Your Own Ending", before re-labelled as "You Choose the Ending") which utilize the interactivity function of Discovery Family Go platform (and previously that of YouTube, before such function was disabled for child-oriented videos in January 2020). In the shorts, viewers are offered three choices, each containing a different ending, at the end of the main video. Each ending can be watched by clicking (or tapping) a button onscreen. The endings don't affect the series' entire continuity, however.

Home media releases

References

External links
 My Little Pony: Equestria Girls film series and specials at Allspark
 My Little Pony: Equestria Girls (series) at Allspark

My Little Pony: Equestria Girls
2013 introductions
Lists of animation
Magical girl films
Magical girl television series